The 1986–1987 protests in France is mass protests and a political movement that erupted after a new law signed by the government in November 1986, named the Devaquet law, sparking mass student protests and Strikes across France from 28 November 1986 – 11 January 1987. Riots and looting occurred throughout the city of Paris but spread to 3 other cities.

Background
After the Death of Malik Oussekine, a student who did not participate in the demonstrations across Paris and other suburbs led by students, Police brutality and police reforms became a question and police violence against demonstrators became questionable among protesters. Protests broke out against his death.

Protests
Mass rallies were held nationwide after a series of protests and peaceful demonstrations, led by 600,000 students and young civilians living in suburbs in Paris and surrounding towns against the death of Death of Malik Oussekine, a Franco-Algerian student who did not participate in protests and was killed in custody and demanded the withdrawal of the Devaquet law.

Working-class strikes and Occupations occurred in 50 areas nationwide after tense protests in the central of Paris and inspired other sectors to protest. Protesters rallied on 5 December, the biggest protest movement yet. Workers and students participated in huge Marches against the law.

Widespread social unrest broke out on 7 December, after the death of Malik. Protests turned into escalating tensions and student demonstrations turned violent. Riot police clashed with demonstrators marching in downtown Paris in protest at the killing. Protesters rallied again throughout early-January 1987, after a series of protests the month before. Students rioted again and reminders of the May 1968 movement was rising. After chaotic scenes during 3 weeks of nonviolent-turned violent demonstrations, the protests ended with 200 injured and one killed.

See also
 Death of Malik Oussekine

References

Riots and civil disorder in France
Protests in France
1986 protests
1987 protests